Starting Over is the twentieth  studio album by American country music artist Reba McEntire on October 3, 1995.  It was a tribute to her roots and influences, featuring cover versions of songs by artists whom she admired growing up. Among the artists being covered were Dolly Parton, Donna Summer, Linda Ronstadt, The Supremes, Lee Greenwood and Patti LaBelle.

McEntire called on Trisha Yearwood, Martina McBride and Linda Davis to join her for "On My Own", the album's first single. Additionally, a CBS television special entitled Reba: Celebrating 20 Years featured McEntire performing songs from the album in concert interspersed with footage of her returning home to her family in Oklahoma. The special was eventually released separately on video. The album peaked at No. 1 on the Billboard country albums chart and at No. 5 on the Billboard 200. It was certified Platinum by the RIAA three months after its release.

The album featured only one Top 10 single, "Ring On Her Finger, Time On Her Hands", which had been previously a Top Ten country hit for Greenwood in the mid-1980s; McEntire's rendition was a Top Ten hit as well upon its 1996 release, reaching No. 9 on the Billboard Hot Country Singles chart. The third single, "Starting Over Again" was composed by Summer and her husband Bruce Sudano, and had originally been a number one hit for Parton in 1980; McEntire's version reached the top-twenty. The fourth and final single, a cover of the Supremes' hit "You Keep Me Hangin' On", was not released to country radio, but did reach number 2 on Billboards Hot Dance Club Play chart.

Love to Infinity produced remixes of the track "You Keep Me Hangin' On" that were released to dance clubs in the US. As a result, this song spent two weeks at No. 2 on the Billboard Hot Dance Club Play chart, McEntire's only hit on this survey.

The debuted at No. 1 on the Billboard Country Albums chart for the week of October 21, 1995, selling 101,000 copies. It stayed at No. 1 for two consecutive weeks and remained in the Top Ten for 19 weeks. It debuted at No. 5 on the Billboard Top 200 Albums chart for the week of October 21, 1995, and remained in the Top Ten for two weeks.

Track listing

 Personnel 

 Reba McEntire – lead vocalsMusicians Steve Nathan – keyboards, synthesizers, Wurlitzer electric piano
 Michael Omartian – acoustic piano, keyboards, arrangements, string arrangements 
 Larry Byrom – acoustic guitar, electric guitar
 Dann Huff – electric guitar
 Mac McAnally – acoustic guitar
 Terry Crisp – steel guitar
 Leland Sklar – bass guitar
 Carlos Vega – drums
 Tom Roady – percussion
 Rob Hajacos – fiddle
 Chris Hicks – saxophone
 The Nashville String Machine – stringsBacking vocalists Bob Bailey
 Karla Bonoff
 Lisa Cochran
 Linda Davis
 Vicki Hampton
 Martina McBride
 Michael Mellett
 Kim Richey
 Chris Rodriguez
 Wendy Waldman
 Trisha YearwoodProduction Tony Brown – producer
 Reba McEntire – producer
 Michael Omartian – associate producer 
 Terry Christian – engineer (1, 4, 5–8, 10), overdub recording
 Steve Tillisch – engineer (2, 3, 9)
 Grant Greene – assistant engineer (1, 4, 5–8, 10), overdub recording
 Pete Martinez – assistant engineer (2, 3, 9)
 King Williams – overdub assistant
 John Guess – mixing
 Derek Bason – mix assistant
 Marty Williams – mastering
 Cindy Owen – art direction, design 
 Mark Tucker – photography 
 Narvel Blackstock – managementStudios' 
 Recorded at Emerald Sound Studios, Sixteenth Avenue Sound and Javelina Recording Studios (Nashville, Tennessee).
 Mixed and Mastered at The Work Station (Nashville, Tennessee).

Charts

Weekly charts

Year-end charts

Singles

Certifications and sales

References

1995 albums
Reba McEntire albums
MCA Records albums
Albums produced by Tony Brown (record producer)
Covers albums